Boyan Petrov (born 7 February 1973 – disappeared 5 May 2018) was a Bulgarian zoologist and mountaineer, who worked at the National Museum of Natural History in Sofia.

He was married to Radoslava Nenova and they have a child - Yavor Petrov.

At the time of his disappearance he had climbed 10 out of the 14 eight-thousanders, all without supplementary oxygen. As of October 2019, this achievement tied him with Atanas Skatov as the Bulgarian altitude climber with the highest number of successful ascents of peaks over 8000 meters. He was the first Bulgarian to summit four of those mountains: Gasherbrum I (2009), Kangchenjunga (2014), K2 (2014) and Manaslu (2015).

Achievements
On 20 May 2014 he became the first Bulgarian to climb the third highest peak on Earth Kangchenjunga (8586m), as well as the first diabetic to ascend to such an altitude and without oxygen. On 23 July he climbed Broad Peak (8047m). On 31 July 2014 he became the first Bulgarian to climb the second highest peak on the planet K2 (8611m), which also made him the 35th person to climb three eight-thousanders in less than 100 days. His double climb – on Broad Peak and K2 - in 8 days, is also a world record. For these remarkable successes the Bulgarian climber was greeted with a video message by mountaineering legend Reinhold Messner. His documentary film about his climbs "3x8000" was broadcast on Bulgarian National Television in December 2014. He reached the summit of Mt. Dhaulagiri (8167m) on 29 September 2017 at 01:00 pm without the help of supplementary oxygen.

Boyan Petrov was a cancer survivor and a diabetic. In 2008 he fell while climbing in the Alps and broke his leg. During the descent of Gasherbrum II in 2009 he fell in a glacial crevasse and was saved by a group of Spanish climbers. In 2013 Petrov suffered another leg fracture due to a car accident. Despite his injuries, in the following year he achieved a hat-trick by successfully climbing Kangchenjunga, Broad Peak, and K2 with internal fixators in this leg. After the descent of K2, he suffered a serious hypoglycemic crisis while in base camp, lost consciousness and was able to recover with the help of Polish climbers.

Disappearance

Petrov was declared missing on 5 May 2018 while climbing Shishapangma. The search for him was discontinued on 16 May. According to other climbers, he may have fallen into a crevasse on the way to the top.

Ascents of peaks over 6000 meters 

Source:

See also 
 Hristo Prodanov
 List of deaths on eight-thousanders
 List of people who disappeared

References 

1973 births
2010s missing person cases
Bulgarian mountain climbers
Bulgarian zoologists
Missing person cases in China
Mountaineering deaths
Scientists from Sofia
Sport deaths in China
Possibly living people